Spiritual Love is the second album of gospel group, Trin-i-tee 5:7. The album features the singles, "Put Your Hands", "I Promise" (featuring Crystal Lewis) and "My Body" and "There He Is". The album chartered #1 Top Gospel Albums, #5 (Top Christian), #5 (Heatseekers), #41 Top R&B charts, and #174 Billboard 200. The album featured collaborations with gospel artists such as Kirk Franklin, Tramaine Hawkins, Crystal Lewis, and Natalie Wilson (founder of the S.O.P Chorale).

Track listing
Put Your Hands 
My Body 
Spiritual Love 
Imagine That 
Interlude: Tribute 
Highway (featuring Tramaine Hawkins)
Gonna Get Myself Together (featuring Kirk Franklin)
There He Is 
How You Living 
I Promise You (featuring Crystal Lewis)
You Were There 
We Know 
The Day You Came 
Interlude: Prayer 
If They Only Knew 
Y'all Put Your Hands [Remix]

Chart history

References

Trin-i-tee 5:7 albums
1999 albums